Kagenori (written: 景範 or 景憲) is a masculine Japanese given name. Notable people with the name include:

, Japanese samurai
, Imperial Japanese Navy admiral
, Japanese samurai
, Japanese diplomat

Japanese masculine given names